Get Up On It is the fourth studio album by the American R&B recording artist Keith Sweat. It was released by Elektra Records on June 28, 1994 in the United States and went to number one on the Billboard Top R&B/Hip-Hop Albums chart for two weeks, while also reaching number eight on the Billboard 200 chart.

Singles from the album include the lead-off single "How Do You Like It?", the title track and "When I Give My Love" – overall were Top 30 R&B hits. The album features collaborations from the late Left Eye of TLC, Roger Troutman of Zapp and up and coming group Kut Klose, which features Athena Cage. On December 6, 1994, Get Up on It was certified platinum by the Recording Industry Association of America, for shipments of one million copies in the United States.

Track listing

Personnel
Keith Sweat – main performer, producer, writer, executive producer
Jerry Flowers – producer, writer
Eric McCaine – producer, writer
Lisa Lopes – writer, guest performer
Kut Klose – performer
Fitzgerald Scott – producer, writer
Roger Troutman – guest performer
William Ward (Billybad) – producer, writer
Joe Jefferson – producer, writer
Anthony Leach – producer, writer

Charts

Weekly charts

Year-end charts

Certifications

See also
List of number-one R&B albums of 1994 (U.S.)

References 

1994 albums
Elektra Records albums
Keith Sweat albums